The Arca de Noé (Noah's Ark) is an independent supporters group of O'Higgins, a football club in the Primera División de Chile.

History

The barra was founded in July 1996, having today 32 members that travel around Chile following the club in all their matches.

On February 9, 2013; the barra suffered a bus accident in Tomé, where died 16 persons, and 21 results with injuries.

Tomé Tragedy

After the match between the club and Huachipato, a group of fans traveled in a bus to Tomé, where in the Cuesta Caracol fell into a ravine, causing the death of 16 fans. The event marked the Chilean football, the city of Rancagua and Tomé, so that a date of mourning decreed in the different leagues of the ANFP, and a days in Rancagua and Tomé. The fact affected to all the supporters of the club.

External links

References

O'Higgins F.C.
Rancagua
Chilean football supporters' associations